Troublesome Night 8 is a 2000 Hong Kong horror comedy film produced by Nam Yin and directed by Edmond Yuen. It is the eighth of the 20 films in the Troublesome Night film series.

Plot
Bud Pit and his family leave the city and move to the countryside. While moving in, Bud Pit accidentally knocks over a small incense stick holder and is disturbed by a spirit for a while. He is also attracted to his new, cheerful neighbour Olive. He becomes suspicious of her when he sees her roaming the streets at night, not recognising him and behaving like a completely different person. He tells his mother, the expert ghostbuster Mrs Bud Lung, and she unravels the mystery. They learn that Olive has been possessed by a ghost who is looking for her lost son. Mrs Bud Lung promises to help the ghost reunite with her (also deceased) son on the condition that she leaves Olive's body after the reunion.

Cast
 Nadia Chan as Olive
 Simon Lui as Bud Pit
 Law Lan as Mrs Bud Lung
 Tong Ka-fai as Bud Gay
 Halina Tam as Moon
 Onitsuka as Baat
 Mr Nine as Kau
 Maggie Cheung Ho-yee as woman at temple
 Jameson Lam as man on bus

External links
 
 

2000 comedy horror films
2000 films
Hong Kong comedy horror films
2000s Cantonese-language films
Troublesome Night (film series)
2000s Hong Kong films